Cristina Alcalde  (born 3 March 1980) is a road cyclist from Spain. She represented her nation at the 2004 UCI Road World Championships. In 2006 Alcalde was suspended for two years after she failed a drug test.

References

External links
 profile at Procyclingstats.com

1980 births
Spanish female cyclists
Living people
Place of birth missing (living people)
Doping cases in cycling
Cyclists from Navarre